Emerson Orlando de Melo (born 2 March 1973), known as Emerson, is a former Brazilian football player.

Club statistics

References

External links

1973 births
Living people
Brazilian footballers
Brazilian expatriate footballers
J1 League players
Esporte Clube Bahia players
Esporte Clube Vitória players
Grêmio Foot-Ball Porto Alegrense players
Guarani FC players
Brasiliense Futebol Clube players
Ituano FC players
América Futebol Clube (SP) players
Tokyo Verdy players
Expatriate footballers in Japan
Association football defenders